Alexandra Silocea (born 1984) is a Romanian born French pianist and Bösendorfer artist.

About
Alexandra Silocea was born in Romania. She began piano lessons at age of eight with Gabriela Raducanu in Constanta/Romania. At the age of 11 she continued her studies at the "George Enescu" Music School in Bucharest.

After auditioning for the late Mihaela Ursuleasa in 2000, Mihaela encouraged Alexandra to apply for the entrance exam at the University of Music and Performing Arts Vienna.

16 years old, Alexandra passed the entrance exam and started studying at the Music University in Vienna.

Among her teachers were Oleg Maisenberg and Johannes Marian. 

In 2008, she started studying at the Conservatoire National Superieur de Musique et de Danse Paris with Th. Paraschivesco and Laurent Cabasso.

Alexandra Silocea began appearing in concerts and recitals throughout Europe, the U.S., Canada and South America after her debut in 2008 with the Vienna Chamber Orchestra and Conductor Pablo Gonzalez.

Discography 
2011 Debut CD Prokofiev Piano Sonatas 1–5

2013 "Sound Waves", Works by Romberg, Debussy, Ravel, Liszt, and Schubert/Liszt

2015 Cello Sonatas by Enescu, Shostakovich & Prokofiev

References
 http://www.musicweb-international.com/classrev/2011/June11/Prokofiev_Silocea_AV2183.htm
 https://www.prestomusic.com/classical/products/8030397--alexandra-silocea-sound-waves
 https://bachtrack.com/de_DE/review-eastbourne-congress-theatre-lpo-silocea
 https://www.theguardian.com/music/2015/nov/25/elisabeth-leonskaja-and-friends-review
 https://theartsdesk.com/classical-music/leonskaja-70th-birthday-concert-wigmore-hall
 https://business-review.eu/bucharest-going-out/concerts/classic-is-fantastic-george-enescu-international-festival-2019-highlights-204045
 https://seenandheard-international.com/2015/11/elisabeth-leonskaja-celebrates-70th-birthday-with-friends-at-the-wigmore-hall/
 https://www.romania-insider.com/enescu-festival-highlights-aug-2021
 https://www.romania-muzical.ro/articol/interviurile-radio-romania-muzical-cu-pianista-alexandra-silocea-21-iunie/1413881/3001/1
 https://www.mahler-steinbach.at/english/archive/festival-2019-en/
 http://www.sprkfv.net/journal/three24/summary24.html
 https://www.classicalsource.com/article/feature-review-24th-biennial-george-enescu-international-music-festival/
 https://revistacariere.ro/inspiratie/cover-story/in-spatele-reflectoarelor-lumea-muzicala-este-dura/
 https://northwestmeath.ie/dma-presents-gabriela-istoc-alexandra-silocea/

External links 
 Official website
 Enescu Festival
 Bösendorfer Artist

1984 births
Living people
Romanian pianists
Romanian women pianists
Place of birth missing (living people)
University of Music and Performing Arts Vienna alumni
21st-century women musicians
21st-century pianists
Women classical pianists
French pianists
French women pianists